The People's Democratic Movement is a political party in the Turks and Caicos Islands founded by James Alexander George Smith McCartney and Lewis Edwin Astwood III. The party is led by the current opposition leader, Edwin Astwood.

According to the PDM's website, the People's Democratic Movement (PDM) is the oldest established political organization in the Turks and Caicos Islands.  Founded in October 1975, the PDM was the first party to be elected to head the Government.

At the 2003 legislative elections, the party won 7 out of 13 seats. It lost two of these seats at a by-election on 7 August 2003.  In the 9 February 2007 elections the party won only 2 out of 15 seats.

In July 2012, Oswald Skippings was elected as the leader of the PDM, while Sharlene Cartwright-Robinson defeated Sean Astwood to become the party's first-ever female deputy leader. The party fielded 15 candidates in the 2012 election.
On November 9, 2012 the PDM was defeated by the PNP and Oswald Skippings stepped down as leader.

Electoral performance

References

Political parties in the Turks and Caicos Islands
1975 establishments in the Turks and Caicos Islands
Political parties established in 1975
Liberal parties in British Overseas Territories